Santi Suk is a district (amphoe) in the central part of Nan province, northern Thailand.

History
The minor district (king amphoe) Santi Suk was established on 15 June 1981, when the two tambons Du Phong and Pa Laeo Luang were split off from Mueang Nan district. The third tambon, Phong, was assigned from Mae Charim district on 21 April 1983. The minor district was upgraded to a full district on 4 July 1994.

Geography
Neighboring districts are, from the north clockwise, Tha Wang Pha, Pua, Bo Kluea, Mae Charim, Phu Phiang and Mueang Nan.

The eastern part of the district is in the Luang Prabang Range mountain area of the Thai highlands.

Administration
The district is divided into three sub-districts (tambons), which are further subdivided into 31 villages (mubans). There are no municipal (thesaban) areas, and three tambon administrative organizations (TAO).

References

External links
amphoe.com

Santi Suk